This is a list of films which have placed number one at the weekend box office in the United Kingdom during 2007.

Notes

References

See also
British films of 2007
List of number-one DVDs of 2007 (UK)

2007
United Kingdom
Box office number-one films